Haemanthus coccineus, the blood flower, blood lily or paintbrush lily, is a species of flowering plant in the amaryllis family Amaryllidaceae, native to Southern Africa.

The generic name Haemanthus is derived from the Greek words haima for blood and anthos for flower; coccineus is the Latin word for red or scarlet. In the Afrikaans language it is known as bergajuin, bloedblom, and many other vernacular names.

Distribution
Haemanthus coccineus is widespread throughout the winter rainfall region in Southern Africa - from the southern parts of Namibia, to South Africa in the Cape Peninsula, to the Keiskamma River in the Eastern Cape. It is found in Renosterveld and Fynbos habitats.

It is an adaptable species, growing in a wide range of soils derived from sandstones, quartzites, granites, shales and limestones. It is hardy down to about  but does not survive freezing temperatures for any length of time.

It is often found in clumps of hundreds, under the shelter of other shrubs on flat land, or in shady ravines and rock crevices.

Description
The flowerheads of Haemanthus coccineus emerge between February and April, with scarlet spathe valves on them like bright shaving brushes, make it a striking plant. The flowers are soon followed by translucent, fleshy berries. There are usually two large leaves per bulb, and occasionally three, which appear after flowering.

The brilliant flowerheads account for its early appearance in Europe, being described by Carl Linnaeus in 1762. Together with Haemanthus sanguineus (Jacq.), this was the first Haemanthus to be introduced to European horticulture as an ornamental plant. In cultivation in the UK, H. coccineus has gained the Royal Horticultural Society’s Award of Garden Merit. It can be grown outdoors in a warm, frost-free, sheltered, south-facing location.

Despite Linnaeus' description, this same species was described under a host of different names (see gallery captions), which reflects more on taxonomic disorganisation than species variability. The plant figured on the left, was first described as Haemanthus hyalocarpus by Jacquin in 1804, and those in the gallery below, which are all H. coccineus, were first described under the caption names.

See also
Cape Floristic Region
 List of plants known as lily

References

Gallery
Haemanthus coccineus in botanical illustrations, with former synonyms:

External links

Pacific Bulb Society | Haemanthus coccineus
PlantZAfrica.com Treatment: Haemanthus coccineus
Haemanthus coccineus - International Bulb Society Photo Gallery
 

coccineus
Flora of Namibia
Flora of the Cape Provinces
Fynbos
Plants described in 1753
Taxa named by Carl Linnaeus
Garden plants of Africa